Simón Colina Domínguez (born 7 February 1995) is a Spanish footballer who play for Icelandic third-tier club  UMF Vikingur Olafsvik as a midfielder.

Club career
Born in Barcelona, Catalonia, Colina joined FC Barcelona's youth setup in 2007, aged 12, after starting it out at Girona FC. On 31 July 2013, after finishing his graduation, he signed a two-year deal with Scottish Premiership side Partick Thistle F.C. on a free transfer.

On 12 August 2015, after making no appearances for The Jags, Colina joined Cypriot First Division team Nea Salamis Famagusta FC. He made his professional debut on 22 August, coming on as a second-half substitute for Aldo Adorno in a 3–5 away loss against AC Omonia. On 15 December 2016 he moved to Polish club Radomiak Radom. He left the club at the end of 2018.

References

External links
Partick Thistle official profile

Radomiak Radom site

1995 births
Living people
Footballers from Barcelona
Spanish footballers
Association football midfielders
Partick Thistle F.C. players
Cypriot First Division players
Nea Salamis Famagusta FC players
Sandnes Ulf players
Spanish expatriate footballers
Spanish expatriate sportspeople in Poland
Spanish expatriate sportspeople in Scotland
Spanish expatriate sportspeople in Cyprus
Spanish expatriate sportspeople in Norway
Expatriate footballers in Scotland
Expatriate footballers in Cyprus
Expatriate footballers in Poland
Expatriate footballers in Norway